MKB Raduga (meaning Raduga Design Bureau, where raduga literally means "rainbow") is a Russian aerospace company, concerned with the production of various missile-systems and related technologies. It is headquartered in Dubna, Moscow Oblast. Formerly a division of the Mikoyan-Gurevich design bureau, it was spun off as a separate OKB (design bureau) in March 1957.

History
 October 1946 - OKB-2
 12 October 1951 - division of OKB-155-1 (headed by Mikhail Gurevich)
 March 1957 - Aleksandr Bereznyak became the chief designer
 June 1965 - machine building design bureau "Raduga"
 19 June 1972 - Dubna production and development amalgamation "Raduga"
 7 September 1978 - Dubna production amalgamation "Raduga"
 12 May 1982 - machine building design bureau "Raduga"

Products

Kometa series
 KS-1 Komet (AS-1 "Kennel") - the first Soviet air-launched anti-ship cruise missile, began development 1947
 K-10S (AS-2 "Kipper") - heavy anti-ship missile, Tu-16, 1955

Naval P-Series
 P-15 Termit (SS-N-2 "Styx") - ship-launched cruise missile (the basis for the Chinese HY-2 Silkworm missile), 1955
 P-270/3M80 Moskit (SS-N-22 "Sunburn") - ramjet-propelled anti-ship missile, 1973, in-service 1984

Kh/KSR airborne series

 R-4/K-9 (AA-4 "Awl") - long-range air-to-air missile, late 1950s
 KSR-2 (AS-5 "Kelt") -  1956, Tu-16KSR-2
 KSR-5/Kh-26 (AS-6 "Kingfish") - Tu-16K-26, Tu-16KSR-2-5, Tu-16KSR-2-5-11. Development of Kh-22. Development authorized 24 August 1962. Officially entered service 12 November 1969 (along with K-10-26). Retired in 1994.
 KSR-11, (AS-5B) - anti-radar missile, air-launched. 1971
 Kh-15 (AS-16 "Kickback")) - hypersonic aeroballistic short-range attack missile, using liquid-fuel rocket propulsion. Tu-22M2,M3, Tu-95MS. First missiles were built in 1978. Serial production in mid-1980s.
 Kh-20 (AS-3 "Kangaroo") - air-launched cruise missile, Tu-95K. Development of "K-20 system" (consisting of Kh-20 missile, Tu-95K carrier, etc.) was authorized 11 March 1954.
 Kh-20M (AS-3 "Kangaroo") - Kh-20 with improved thermo-nuclear warhead. K-20 has officially entered service 9 September 1960. Retired in 1991 due to SALT-1 agreement.
 Kh-22 (AS-4 "Kitchen") - anti-ship missile, Tu-22K, Tu-22M, Tu-95K-22. Development of "missile complex K-22" was authorized 15 April 1958. Officially entered service 9 February 1971. K-95-22 (with Tu-95K-22 aircraft) entered service in 1987.
 Kh-28 (AS-9 "Kyle") - anti-radar missile
 Kh-32 - Tu-22M
 Kh-45 - Sukhoi T-4, Sukhoi T-4MS
 Kh-55 Granat (AS-15 "Kent") - cruise missile, 1976, Tu-95MS, Tu-160. Development was authorized 8 December 1976. The first serial Kh-55 was launched 23 February 1981. Officially entered service (complex of Kh-55 and Tu-95MS) 31 December 1983. Also Kh-101 /102 variant.
 Kh-58 (AS-11 "Kilter") - anti-radar missile
 Kh-59 Ovod (AS-13 "Kingbolt") - tactical air-to-surface TV-guided missile
 Kh-59M Ovod-M (AS-18 "Kazoo") -
 Kh-2000, - Sukhoi T-4, Sukhoi T-4MS

Others
 85R, 85RU, (SS-N-14 "Silex") - surface-launched torpedo-carrying anti-submarine missiles
 MV-1 - target drone
 KSR-5-NM - target drone
 Rk-55, S-10 Granat (SSC-X-4 "Slingshot", SS-N-21 "Sampson") - surface, submarine-launched nuclear cruise missiles
 Burlak, Burlak-M air-launched spacecraft launcher, Tu-160SK

References

External links
 Company history

Tactical Missiles Corporation
Science and technology in the Soviet Union
Defence companies of the Soviet Union
Aerospace companies of the Soviet Union
Technology companies established in 1946
1946 establishments in the Soviet Union
Guided missile manufacturers
Companies based in Moscow Oblast
Design bureaus